Metabranchipus is a genus of fairy shrimps within the family Branchipodidae. There are currently 3 species assigned to the genus.

Species 

 Metabranchipus patrizii 
 Metabranchipus prodigiosus 
 Metabranchipus rubra

References 

Anostraca
Branchiopoda genera